Sir John Rogers, 3rd Baronet (31 August 1708 – 20 December 1773) was a British lawyer and politician.

Early life
Baptised in Cornwood, he was the oldest son of Sir John Rogers, 2nd Baronet and his wife Mary Henley, daughter of Sir Robert Henley. Rogers was educated at New College, Oxford, where he matriculated in 1724 and graduated with a Bachelor of Arts two years later. He was then Mayor of Plymouth for 1728-29 and 1743–44 and Recorder of Plymouth (in 1744?). In 1744, he succeeded his father as baronet.

Career
Rogers entered the British House of Commons as member of parliament (MP) for Plymouth in 1739, representing the constituency until the next year, when he was unseated. He served as colonel of the South Devon Militia and was High Sheriff of Devon in 1749 and in 1755.

Family
On 28 October 1742, he married Hannah Trefusis, daughter of Thomas Trefusis at St Benet Paul's Wharf in London. Rogers died of a stroke at his seat in Blachford in Devon and was buried in Cornwood four days later. He had no children and his younger brother Frederick succeeded to the baronetcy.

References

1708 births
1773 deaths
Alumni of New College, Oxford
Baronets in the Baronetage of England
British Militia officers
Devon Militia officers
British MPs 1734–1741
High Sheriffs of Devon
Members of the Parliament of Great Britain for Plymouth
Mayors of Plymouth